is a Japanese footballer who plays for Matsumoto Yamaga FC.

Club statistics
Updated to 26 July 2022.

References

External links
Profile at Matsumoto Yamaga

Profile at Ehime FC

1991 births
Living people
Keio University alumni
Association football people from Aichi Prefecture
Japanese footballers
J1 League players
J2 League players
Shimizu S-Pulse players
Ehime FC players
Matsumoto Yamaga FC players
Association football midfielders